The 1925 LSU Tigers football team was an American football team that represented Louisiana State University (LSU) as a member of the Southern Conference during the 1925 college football season. In its third season under head coach Mike Donahue, LSU compiled a 5–3–1 record (0–2–1 against conference opponents). LSU's first official homecoming game occurred in 1925.

Schedule

References

LSU
LSU Tigers football seasons
LSU Tigers football